Bahlul may refer to:

People 

 Bahlūl, companion of Imam Musa al-Kadhim 
 Bahlul of Shirvan, member of the House of Shirvanshah, the ruling dynasty of Shirvan
 Ali al-Bahlul (born 1969), US Guantanamo Bay detainee
 Bahlul Ibn Marzuq (died 802), Basque rebel under Moorish rule 
 Bahlul Khan Lodi (died 1489), Delhi sultan, founder Lodi Dynasty
 Bahlul Mustafazade, an Azerbaijani football
 Ḥasan bar Bahlul, a 10th-century Christian bishop and Syriac linguist

Places 

 Bahlul, Azerbaijan, a village near the city of Stepanakert, de facto part of the self-proclaimed Republic of Artsakh, de jure in Azerbaijan
 Bahlul, Yemen, a village in west-central Yemen